A high-capacity magazine (or large-capacity magazine) is a magazine capable of holding more than the usual number of rounds of ammunition for a particular firearm.

A magazine may also be defined as high-capacity in a legal sense, based on the number of rounds that are allowed by law in a particular jurisdiction. For example, in the United States, the now-expired Federal Assault Weapons Ban of 1994 restricted magazines that could hold more than ten cartridges.

Types, characteristics, and manufacturers
Drum magazines are high-capacity magazines that are in a cylindrical shape; they once had a reputation for unreliability, but technological improvements resulted in better performance and cheaper cost. As a result, drum magazines became more common in the civilian market in the United States, although they are far less common than standard, lower-capacity, typically 30 round, box magazines. As of 2019, about six manufacturers produced drum magazine in the United States, retailing for about $100 each. Manufacturers include KCI USA and Magpul Industries; the latter produces the same drum magazines for both civilian and military use.

Legal status

Australia

In Australia, handgun magazines holding more than ten rounds as well as rifle magazines holding more than 15 rounds are heavily restricted.

United States

Federal law
Between 1994 and 2004, the Federal Assault Weapons Ban, which included a ban on high-capacity magazines, was in effect. It prohibited new magazines over 10 rounds in the United States. After the expiration of the ban, there is no nationwide prohibition against the possession of high-capacity magazines, which are considered an unregulated firearm accessory. 

Legislation to restore a federal high-capacity magazine ban has been repeatedly introduced by Democrats in the United States Congress since the expiration of the Federal Assault Weapons Ban, especially in the wake of mass shootings in the United States in which high-capacity magazines were used, including the Tucson shooting (2011), the Aurora, Colorado movie theater shooting (2012), and the Harvest music festival shooting (2017). These efforts have been thus far unsuccessful. The federal Keep Americans Safe Act, which would restore the ban on new magazines that hold more than 10 rounds, passed the House Judiciary Committee in September 2019.

State laws
As of 2019, nine states and the District of Columbia set a maximum limit on the capacity of magazines for at least some firearms. The nine states with high-capacity-magazine limitations are California (Proposition 63, passed in 2016), Colorado, Connecticut, Hawaii, Maryland, Massachusetts, New Jersey, New York, and Vermont. Hawaii's magazine-size  limitation only applies to handguns; the laws in the other eight states and D.C. apply to all types of guns. All of the ten jurisdictions with magazine-size limits set the maximum at 10 rounds, except for Colorado (which sets a maximum of 15 rounds) and Vermont (which sets a maximum of 15 rounds for handguns and 10 rounds for long-guns). The types of acts prohibited vary among the ten jurisdictions; most prohibit manufacturer, sale, or possession, but some states' laws are narrower (Maryland law does not ban possession of high-capacity magazines) while other states' laws are broader (some states also ban the transfer, transportation, or acquisition of high-capacity magazines). Some states' laws include "grandfather" pre-ban high-capacity magazines, exempting these from their law, while other states' laws do not. 

The constitutionality of high-capacity magazine bans has been repeatedly upheld by United States courts of appeal courts, under a prior "interest balancing test" approach which has been ruled as an unconstitutional method of deciding second amendment cases, including the courts of appeals for the First Circuit, Second Circuit, Third Circuit, Fourth Circuit, Seventh Circuit, Ninth Circuit, and D.C. Circuit,. The Supreme Court of the United States has issued grant, vacate, and remand orders for the active cases in the Third, Fourth, and Ninth Circuits to be reconsidered in light of New York State Rifle & Pistol Association, Inc. v. Bruen.

See also

Assault weapon

References

Further reading

Gun politics in the United States
Magazines (firearms)